Donata Jancewicz-Wawrzyniak (born 17 June 1969 in Gdańsk) is a retired female high jumper from Poland. She set her personal best on 23 August 1998, jumping 1.95 metres at the European Championships in Budapest where she won silver medal. She is a four-time Polish national indoor champion. She represented her native country at the 1992 Summer Olympics in Barcelona, Spain.

Competition record

References

External links
 
 Women's World All-Time List 
 Polish Olympic Committee 
 GBR Athletics

1969 births
Living people
Polish female high jumpers
Athletes (track and field) at the 1992 Summer Olympics
Olympic athletes of Poland
Sportspeople from Gdańsk
European Athletics Championships medalists